Bart Drechsel (born 24 September 1952) is a bobsledder who represented the Netherlands Antilles in the two man event at the 1988 Winter Olympics.

References

External links
 

1952 births
Living people
Curaçao sportsmen
Dutch Antillean male bobsledders
Olympic bobsledders of the Netherlands Antilles
Bobsledders at the 1988 Winter Olympics
Place of birth missing (living people)